See Special Protection Area to understand what this list is referring to.
As of August 2004, the list of sites was as follows:

England

Scotland

Wales

Northern Ireland

External links

Official map showing location of special protection areas in the UK

 
Special protection areas in the United Kingdom